The list of college football yearly receiving leaders identifies the major college receiving leaders for each season from 1937 to the present. It includes yearly leaders in three statistical categories: (1) receptions, (2) receiving yardage; (3) yards per reception; and (4) receiving touchdowns.

Eleven players have led the NCAA in one or more of these categories in multiple seasons. They are: Reid Moseley of Georgia (1944–1945); Hugh Campbell of Washington State (1960–1961); Vern Burke of Oregon State (1962–1963); Howard Twilley of Tulsa (1964–1965); Ron Sellers of Florida State (1967–1968); Jerry Hendren of Idaho (1968–1969); Mike Siani of Villanova (1970–1971); Steve Largent of Tulsa (1974–1975); Jason Phillips of Houston (1987–1988); Alex Van Dyke of Nevada (1994–1995); and Brennan Marion of Tulsa (2007–2008).

Since 1937, the NCAA record for receiving yards in a single season has been set or broken nine times as follows: Jim Benton of Arkansas in 1937 (814 yards); Hank Stanton of Arizona in 1941 (820 yards); Ed Barker of Washington State 1951 (864 yards); Hugh Campbell of Washington State in 1960 (881 yards); Vern Burke of Oregon State in 1962 (1,007 yards); Fred Biletnikoff of Florida State in 1964 (1,179 yards); Howard Twilley of Tulsa in 1965 (1,779 yards); Alex Van Dyke of Nevada in 1995 (1,854 yards); and Trevor Insley of Nevada in 1999 (2,060 yards).

During that same time, the record for receptions in a single season has been set or broken 13 times as follows: Jim Benton of Arkansas in 1937 (48); Hank Stanton of Arizona in 1941 (50); Barney Poole of Ole Miss in 1947 (52); Ed Brown of Fordham in 1952 (57); Dave Hibbert of Arizona in 1958 (61); Hugh Campbell of Washington State in 1962 (69); Larry Elkins of Baylor in 1963 (70); Howard Twilley of Tulsa in 1964 (95) and 1965 (134); Manny Hazard of Houston in 1989 (142); Freddie Barnes of Bowling Green in 2009 (155); and Zay Jones of East Carolina in 2016 (158).

Leading programs

Programs with multiple receiving leaders (at least three different individuals, in any of the four categories) include: 
 Houston – 9 (Ken Hebert, Elmo Wright, Jason Phillips, Manny Hazard, Fred Gilbert, Sherman Smith, Ron Peters, Brandon Middleton, and Patrick Edwards)
 San Diego State – 7 (Tom Reynolds, Keith Denson, Dwight McDonald, Jim Sandusky, Patrick Rowe, Derrick Lewis, and J. R. Tolver)
 Louisiana Tech – 6 (Billy Ryckman, Rod Foppe, James Jordan, Troy Edwards, Trent Taylor, and Carlos Henderson)
 Tulsa – 6 (Keyarris Garrett, Brennan Marion, Chris Penn, Ronnie Kelley, Steve Largent, and Howard Twilley)
 Washington State – 5 (Ed Barker, Bill Steiger, Jack Fanning, Hugh Campbell, and Corey Alston)
 Baylor – 5 (Corey Coleman, Sam Boyd, Larry Elkins, Melvin Bonner, and Terrance Williams)
 BYU – 5 (Jay Miller, Clay Brown, Kirk Pendleton, Mark Bellini, and Austin Collie)
 Stanford – 5 (Bill McColl, Sam Morley, John Stewart, Chris Burford, and Devon Cajuste)
 Nevada – 5 (Bryan Reeves, Alex Van Dyke, Damond Wilkins, Trevor Insley, and Nate Burleson)
 Florida – 4 (Broughton Williams, Jack Jackson, Chris Doering, and Reidel Anthony)
 Florida State – 4 (Fred Biletnikoff, Ron Sellers, Barry Smith, and Snoop Minnis)
 Fresno State – 4 (Stephen Baker, Henry Ellard, Rodney Wright, and Davante Adams)
 Georgia – 4 (George Poschner, Reid Moseley, Johnny Carson, and Jimmy Orr)
 Hawaii – 4 (Ashley Lelie, Chad Owens, Davone Bess, and Greg Salas)
 Oklahoma State – 4 (Neill Armstrong, Justin Blackmon, Cecil Hankins, and James Washington)
 Oregon State – 4 (Vern Burke, Reggie Bynum, Mike Hass, and Brandin Cooks)
 Pitt – 4 (Dwight Collins, Julius Dawkins, Antonio Bryant, Larry Fitzgerald)
 Texas Tech – 4 (Elmer Tarbox, Earle Clark, Bake Turner, and Michael Crabtree)
 West Virginia – 4 (Stedman Bailey, Jay Kearney, Calvin Phillips, and David Sills V)
 Notre Dame – 3 (Bernard Kirk, Eddie Anderson, Jim Morse)
 Purdue – 3 (Dave Young, Rodney Carter, & Rondale Moore)
 Western Michigan – 3 (Greg Jennings, Corey Davis, & Jordan White)

Receiving leaders from 1937

Pre-1937 unofficial data 
Before 1937 the NCAA did not compile official statistics. This chart reflects unofficial receiving statistics compiled by historians mostly from newspapers accounts.

References

Receiving